Solena is a genus of flowering plants belonging to the family Cucurbitaceae.

Its native range is Afghanistan to Southern China and Western Malesia.

Species
Species:

Solena amplexicaulis 
Solena delavayi 
Solena heterophylla 
Solena umbellata

References

Cucurbitaceae
Cucurbitaceae genera